Nati ieri is an Italian television series.

See also
List of Italian television series

External links
 

2000s Italian drama television series
Italian medical television series
2006 Italian television series debuts
2007 Italian television series endings
Canale 5 original programming
Rete 4 original programming